Jorge Sigfrido Peredo Gutiérrez (born 17 February 1953) is a Chilean former footballer who played as a forward.

Career
He began his career playing for the team of Castro city, becoming national amateur champion in 1974. Next, he played in Chile for five teams, including Unión Española with whom he won the 1977 Primera División de Chile.

Abroad, he played for Bolivian club  in 1984, his last club.

He made five appearances for the Chile national team in 1979. He was also part of Chile's squad for the 1979 Copa América tournament, becoming the top goalscorer along with the Paraguayan Eugenio Morel.

Personal life
Peredo made his home in Canada.

Honours

Club
Castro (city team)
 Campeonato Nacional Amateur: 1974

Unión Española
 Chilean Primera División: 1977 Primera División de Chile

Individual
 Copa América Top Goalscorer: 1979

References

External links
 

1953 births
Living people
Footballers from Santiago
Chilean footballers
Chilean expatriate footballers
Association football forwards
Chile international footballers
Ñublense footballers
C.D. Aviación footballers
Unión Española footballers
Club Deportivo Palestino footballers
Puerto Montt footballers
Chilean Primera División players
Primera B de Chile players
Bolivian Primera División players
Chilean expatriate sportspeople in Bolivia
Expatriate footballers in Bolivia
Chilean expatriates in Canada